In modal logic, the modal depth of a formula is the deepest nesting of modal operators (commonly  and ). Modal formulas without modal operators have a modal depth of zero.

Definition 

Modal depth can be defined as follows. Let  be a function that computes the modal depth for a modal formula :

, where  is an atomic formula.

Example 

The following computation gives the modal depth of :

Modal depth and semantics 

The modal depth of a formula indicates 'how far' one needs to look in a Kripke model when checking the validity of the formula. For each modal operator, one needs to transition from a world in the model to a world that is accessible through the accessibility relation. The modal depth indicates the longest 'chain' of transitions from a world to the next that is needed to verify the validity of a formula.

To check whether , it may be needed to take two steps in the model but it could be less, depending on the structure of the model.

References 

Modal logic